Sabine is a German television series.

The cast included Astrid M. Fünderich.

See also
List of German television series

External links
 

2004 German television series debuts
2005 German television series endings
German-language television shows
ZDF original programming